Visoun (Vixoun also Visunarat or Vixounarath) was the king of Lan Xang from 1500 until 1520. He was the seventh son of King Sai Tia Kaphut, King of Lan Xang. He was appointed as Governor of Vientiane in 1480 and as Chief Minister with the title of Phya Sena Muang in 1491 with the reign name of Visoun (Lightning). He served as Regent for his minor nephew from 1495 to 1497. He deposed his nephew and was proclaimed as King in 1500. He ascended the throne and was crowned King in 1501. His reign was prosperous and peaceful with a large number of shrines and monuments being constructed, including the Maha Vihara of Wat Visoun, which he built to house the palladium of Luang Prabang, the Phra Bang, which had been at Vientiane since 1359. A number of important religious texts and literary works were composed or translated into Lao during his reign. He died at Vientiane in 1520.

Literature during his reign 
During his reign, Visoun invited learned monks to stay in Xiang Dong Xiang Thong (Luang Prabang). At that time, Buddhist and Hindu literature were copied and translated. Lao monks extended the Jatakas to be the Lao version. The Lao version of Jatakas called Ha Sip Xat contains 27 stories which are not in the original Jatakas. Moreover, the Lao monks produced the Lao version of Panchatantra and Ramayana which is known as the Phra Lak Phra Lam.

References 

Kings of Lan Xang
1465 births
1520 deaths
16th-century Laotian people
16th-century monarchs in Asia
Laotian Theravada Buddhists
1510s in Asia
1520s in Asia
15th-century Laotian people